The Arkansas–Pine Bluff Golden Lions football program is a college football team that represents University of Arkansas at Pine Bluff in the Southwestern Athletic Conference, a part of the NCAA Division I Football Championship Subdivision.  The team has had 18 head coaches on record since its first recorded football game in 1923 (Donzell Young held the position twice). In December 2022, Alonzo Hampton was hired as head coach of the Golden Lions.

Key

Coaches
Statistics correct as of the end of the 2022 college football season.

Notes

References
                                   
                                   

Arkansas-Pine Bluff Golden Lions

Arkansas–Pine Bluff Golden Lions football coaches